Batrachedra striolata is a moth in the family Batrachedridae. It is found in North America, where it has been recorded from 
British Columbia to California. The larvae have been recorded feeding on Agave shawii, and Salix lasiolepis.

References

Natural History Museum Lepidoptera generic names catalog

Batrachedridae
Moths of North America
Moths described in 1875
Taxa named by Philipp Christoph Zeller